Salience or saliency may refer to:

Mortality salience, a product of the terror management theory in social psychology
 Motivational salience, a motivational "wanting" attribute given by the brain
 Salience (language), the property of being noticeable or important
 Salience (neuroscience), the perceptual quality by which an observable thing stands out relative to its environment
 Social salience, in social psychology, a set of reasons which draw an observer's attention toward a particular object

See also
 Salient (disambiguation)